Metrotown may refer to:

Metrotown, Burnaby, a town centre in Burnaby, British Columbia, Canada
Metropolis at Metrotown, a shopping mall in Burnaby, British Columbia, Canada, often referred to as Metrotown
Metrotown station, a SkyTrain station serving the above town centre

See also
Metro Town, a high-rise development in Hong Kong